Al Hawiyah is a town in Makkah Province, located 15 km (9.3 miles) from Ta'if. It was a small suburb in the past. Currently it has expanded to include more than 15 residential neighborhoods, with an area of 80 km2 (30.88 mi2) and is inhabited with many different classes of Saudi society. The population of Al Hawiya in 2010 was about 200,000 according to the last national census. Nowadays, Al Hawiyah is considered as an emerging vibrant area with many government facilities. And currently known as North of Ta'if city.

Al Hawiya is about 214 km (150 miles) from Al-Waba Crater.

Landmarks 

 Palace of King Saud bin Abdulaziz Al Saud, whose buildings were annexed to Ta'if University.
 Palace of King Abdullah bin Abdulaziz Al Saud.
 Palace of Prince Mohammed bin Abdulaziz Al Saud.
 Palace of Prince Badr bin Abdulaziz Al Saud.
 King Fahad Air Base (KFAB).
 King Abdullah Air Defense College.
 Ta'if University.
 Ta'if Regional Airport.
 King Fahd Sport City.
 King Faisal Park
 King Khalid Equestrian Square.
 InterContinental Taif Hotel.
 New National Guard Hospital.
 National Guard Housing.

See also 

 List of cities and towns in Saudi Arabia
 Regions of Saudi Arabia

References

Populated places in Mecca Province